The Swedish Royal Society Pro Patria is a Swedish charitable organisation under royal protection since 1775 (King Gustav III), with the purpose of making contributions to education and care of the needy, and by granting wearable medals with royal crown and portrait, rewarding socially beneficial activities as well as long and faithful service.

References

Charities based in Sweden